Dan Carroll (born December 17, 1949) is an American speed skater. He competed at the 1972 Winter Olympics and the 1976 Winter Olympics.

References

1949 births
Living people
American male speed skaters
Olympic speed skaters of the United States
Speed skaters at the 1972 Winter Olympics
Speed skaters at the 1976 Winter Olympics
Sportspeople from St. Louis